Nocardioides ganghwensis is a strictly aerobic, rod-shaped and non-motile bacterium from the genus Nocardioides which has been isolated from tidal flat sediments on Ganghwa Island, Korea.

References

Further reading

External links
Type strain of Nocardioides ganghwensis at BacDive -  the Bacterial Diversity Metadatabase	

ganghwensis
Bacteria described in 2004